The 2023 Saskatchewan Roughriders season is scheduled to be the 65th season for the team in the Canadian Football League. It is the club's 114th year overall, and its 107th season of play. The Roughriders will attempt to qualify for the playoffs following a one-year absence and win their fifth Grey Cup championship. The 2023 CFL season is scheduled to be the fourth season under head coach Craig Dickenson and general manager Jeremy O'Day.

Offseason

CFL Global Draft
The 2023 CFL Global Draft is scheduled to take place in the spring of 2023. If the same format as the 2022 CFL Global Draft is used, the Roughriders will have three selections in the draft with the third-best odds to win the weighted draft lottery.

CFL National Draft
The 2023 CFL Draft is scheduled to take place in the spring of 2023. The Roughriders currently have eight selections in the eight-round draft, with an additional seventh-round pick and the loss of a fifth-round pick. The team is scheduled to have the third selection in each round of the draft after finishing third-last in the 2022 league standings, not including traded picks.

Preseason

Regular season

Standings

Schedule 
The Roughriders will play in a neutral site game in Halifax, against the Toronto Argonauts, who will be the home team for their Week 8 match-up. This will be the second consecutive year that the two teams meet in Nova Scotia and the first repeat matchup in the Touchdown Atlantic series.

Team

Roster

Coaching staff

References

External links
 

Saskatchewan Roughriders seasons
2023 Canadian Football League season by team
2023 in Saskatchewan